Darin Olien is an American author and podcast host. With a B.A. in exercise physiology and an unaccredited M.A. in psychology, he labels himself a "wellness expert", promotes "superfoods" and co-starred as well as produced the Netflix docuseries Down to Earth with Zac Efron in 2020. In 2017, he published SuperLife: The 5 Simple Fixes That Will Make You Healthy, Fit and Eternally Awesome, which claims to determine if a person is healthy enough to fight sicknesses. Olien has introduced a number of diet fads and dietary supplements including "healthiest nuts in the world" known as Barukas and Shakeology, a meal replacement.

In December 2014, actress Eliza Coupe and Olien were married in New Zealand. The couple divorced in 2018. He claims to have become interested in alternative medicine after a football injury in college.

References

Pseudoscientific diet advocates
Living people
1970 births